The Notah Begay III Foundation Challenge, or NB3 Challenge, was a charity golf tournament played at Atunyote Golf Club at the Turning Stone Resort & Casino in Oneida, New York. All proceeds benefit the Notah Begay III Foundation for the creation and delivery of sustainable athletic programming for Native American youth.

Notah Begay III Foundation
In 2005, Notah Begay III, a four-time PGA Tour winner and the first Native American PGA Tour player, established the Notah Begay III Foundation. It is a federally recognized 501(c)3 non-profit organization designed to provide sustainable health and wellness programs for Native American youth. Recognizing the lack of sustainable programming for youth within Tribal communities, Begay established the Foundation to deliver youth sports activities in tribal communities in the form of golf and soccer programs.

Winners
Team event
2013 Team USA (Notah Begay III, Rickie Fowler, Bo Van Pelt, Gary Woodland)
2012 Team West (Notah Begay III, Rickie Fowler, Cristie Kerr, Lexi Thompson, Gary Woodland, Tiger Woods)
2011 Cristie Kerr and Hunter Mahan
2010 Cristie Kerr and Hunter Mahan

Individual event

References

External links
Notah Begay III Foundation Challenge official site

Golf in Syracuse, New York
Native American history of New York (state)
Events in Syracuse, New York